Musa Isiyaku Ahmed is a Nigerian academic. He is the first and current vice-chancellor of Federal University of Agriculture, Zuru. Prof. Ahmed is Fellow College of Veterinary Surgeons Nigeria, Fellow Institute of Human and Natural Resources, Afiliate member Computer Professional Council (CPN), Nigeria Computer Society (NCS) and member, Academia in Information Technology Professionals (AITP). Prof Ahmed hails from borno state in Nigeria.He was formerly Professor in the Department of Veterinary, Parasitology and Entomology at the University of Maiduguri in Borno State

References 

Nigerian educators
Nigerian academics
Year of birth missing (living people)
Living people